WGYS may refer to:

 WGYS-LP, a low-power radio station (102.3 FM) licensed to serve Dixfield, Maine, United States
 WTLP, a radio station (103.9 FM) licensed to serve Braddock Heights, Maryland, United States, which held the call sign WGYS from 2006 to 2007